Misaki Doi and Rebecca Peterson won the women's doubles tennis title at the 2022 Swedish Open after Mihaela Buzărnescu and Irina Khromacheva withdrew from the final, due to Buzărnescu's knee injury.

Mirjam Björklund and Leonie Küng were the reigning champions, but chose not to participate.

Seeds

Draw

Draw

References

External Links
Main Draw

Swedish Open - Doubles